Maloye Sirino is a rural locality (a village) in Yenangskoye Rural Settlement, Kichmengsko-Gorodetsky District, Vologda Oblast, Russia. The population was 5 as of 2002.

Geography 
Maloye Sirino is located 41 km southeast of Kichmengsky Gorodok (the district's administrative centre) by road. Bolshoye Sirino is the nearest rural locality.

References 

Rural localities in Kichmengsko-Gorodetsky District